Mukha ng Buhay is a Philippine drama series produced by Viva Television aired in two networks, PTV and RPN. It aired from April 15, 1996 to January 29, 1999.

Internationally it has been syndicated through MavShack a website featuring Filipino Viva Films Library of collections of classic films and licensed brands from the company since 2013. In 2017, the series is currently rerunning on Sari-Sari Channel.

Plot
The story is all about the faces of life, in dealing with love, friendship, death and family. Starting with the relationship of Emily and Eric. Emily was just a maid at the household of the rich Amanda, the mother of Eric. But the two fell in love with each other. Of course, Amanda doesn't approve this. But still, the two got married. Amanda started to make Emily's life miserable, with the help of her friend Betsay and cousin Carol. Meanwhile, Lani, a very kind-hearted daughter, experiences hardships because of her status in life, and her father, who is a gambler. At least she had her friends Bebang and Inoy to comfort her, not knowing that Inoy has eyes on her, and Bebang has eyes on him. Emily and Lani will meet when Lani applied to be a maid at their household. Will the two overcome their hardships in life?

Cast
Credited Cast
Pilar Pilapil as Amanda
Shintaro Valdes as Eric
Lovely Rivero as Emily
Bernadette Allyson as Lani
Ruby Moreno as Joyce
Nonie Buencamino as Emilio
Wowie de Guzman as Enrique
Anthony Cortes as Inoy
Idelle Martinez as Dianne
Ester Chaves as Manang Munding
Lee Robin Salazar as Luigi
Junior Paronda as Boying
Aura Mijares as Nana Tansing
Kathy Arguelles as Bebang

Extended Cast
Marianne dela Riva as Carol
Vangie Labalan as Bebang's mom
Charina Scott as Dee-dee
Renato del Prado as Mang Gustin

Staff
Writer: RJ Nuevas
Lightning Director: Monino Duque
Associate Producer: Emma Regina Llamas
Supervising Producer: Olive de Jesus
Producer: Veronique del Rosario-Corpus
Executive Producer: Vic del Rosario, Jr.
Director: Jeffrey Jeturian

See also
List of programs previously broadcast by Radio Philippines Network
List of programs aired by People's Television Network

Radio Philippines Network original programming
People's Television Network original programming
Philippine drama television series
1990s Philippine television series
1996 Philippine television series debuts
1999 Philippine television series endings
Television series by Viva Television
Filipino-language television shows